The Suburban League is a high school athletic conference in southeastern Los Angeles County, California affiliated with the CIF Southern Section.

Schools
As of the 2021-22 school year, the members in the league are:
Bellflower High School	
Firebaugh High School
La Mirada High School
Mayfair High School
Norwalk High School

In the past Artesia High, Cabrillo High, Cerritos High, Gahr High, John Glenn, La Serna High, Monte Vista High, Neff High School and Sierra High Schools were members of the league.

References

CIF Southern Section leagues